Narendra N. Dave (10 March 1950 – 16 September 2014) was an Indian-born Kenyan cricket umpire. He stood in one ODI game in 2001.

See also
 List of One Day International cricket umpires

References

1950 births
2014 deaths
Kenyan One Day International cricket umpires
People from Anand district
Indian emigrants to Kenya
Kenyan people of Gujarati descent
Kenyan people of Indian descent